The Chadstone Football Club (formerly Syndal Tally-Ho) is an Australian rules football club based in Chadstone, Victoria, Australia. The club participates in the Victorian Amateur Football Association D4 league. The club also has a team which participates in the Football Integration Development Association (FIDA) competition for players with an intellectual disability.

History 

The Syndal Tally Ho football club was formed in 1983, when the Syndal and the Tally Ho Football Clubs merged. The club changed its name to Chadstone after the 2008 season. The club won the Senior and Reserves D4 VAFA Premierships in 2001.

Home ground 
Jordan Reserve, Burton Street, Chadstone View map

Emblem & Colours 
Demon, Royal Blue, Red and White

External links 
Chadstone Football Club website

Victorian Amateur Football Association clubs
1983 establishments in Australia
Australian rules football clubs established in 1983
Australian rules football clubs in Melbourne
Sport in the City of Monash